This is a list of presidential trips made by Joe Biden during 2022, the second year of his presidency as the 46th president of the United States.

This list excludes trips made within Washington, D.C., the U.S. federal capital in which the White House, the official residence and principal workplace of the president, is located. Also excluded are trips to Camp David, the country residence of the president. International trips are included. The number of visits per state or territory where he traveled were:

 One: Alabama, Arizona, Georgia, Guam, Hawaii, Iowa, Kentucky, Minnesota, Nevada, New Hampshire, New Jersey, Puerto Rico, South Carolina, U.S. Virgin Islands, and Washington 
 Two: Alaska, Colorado, Florida, Illinois, Michigan, New Mexico, North Carolina, Oregon, Texas, and Wisconsin
 Three: California 
 Four: Massachusetts and Ohio
 Seven: Virginia
 Eight: New York
 Nine: Maryland
 Eleven: Pennsylvania
 Thirty: Delaware

January

February

March

April

May

June

July

August

September

October

November

December

See also
 Presidency of Joe Biden
 List of international presidential trips made by Joe Biden
 List of presidential trips made by Joe Biden

References

Presidential travels of Joe Biden
2022 in American politics
2022 in international relations
2022-related lists
Lists of events in the United States
Joe Biden-related lists